Achanthiptera rohrelliformis is a fly from the family Muscidae. It is found in the Palearctic .
The larvae are found in the nests of wasps and hornets where they feed upon organic remains and the dead carcasses of the wasps and their larvae.

References

External links
D'Assis Fonseca, E.C.M, 1968 Diptera Cyclorrhapha Calyptrata: Muscidae Handbooks for the Identification of British Insects pdf
Seguy, E. (1923) Diptères Anthomyides. Paris: Éditions Faune de France Faune n° 6 393 p., 813 fig.Bibliotheque Virtuelle Numerique  pdf

Muscidae
Muscomorph flies of Europe
Insects described in 1830